("role language") is a style of language, often used in works of fiction, that conveys certain traits about its speaker such as age, gender, and class. It is particularly used in reference to the styles of speech found in Japanese-language media such as manga, anime, and novels. Although highly recognisable, it is usually partially or entirely distinct from the real life language typical of the kind of people it is used to represent.

The concept was first proposed by Japanese linguist Satoshi Kinsui in 2003.

Example
The following sentences all have the same meaning; "Yes, I know"
 sō da yo, boku ga shitteru no sa: boy (or if spoken by a female, a tomboy)
 sō yo, atashi ga shitteru wa: girl
 sō desu wa yo, watakushi ga zonjite orimasu wa: noblewoman
 sō ja, sessha ga zonjite oru: samurai
 sō ja, washi ga shitte oru: elder doctor
 so ya, wate ga shittoru dee: Kansai dialect speaker (often associated with comedian, merchant, gangster or a non-English-speaking westerner)
 nda, ora shitteru da: country person
 sō aru yo, watashi ga shitteru aru yo: Chinese person (see )

References

External links
Japanese in Anime & Manga

Japanese language
Anime and manga terminology
Narrative techniques